UFC Fight Night 223 (also known as UFC on ESPN+ 81) is an upcoming mixed martial arts event produced by the Ultimate Fighting Championship that will take place on April 29, 2023, at TBD venue and location.

Background 

While not officially announced by the organization, a lightweight bout between Arman Tsarukyan and Renato Moicano is expected to headline the event.

A middleweight bout between Cody Brundage and Rodolfo Vieira is expected to take place at the event. They were previously scheduled to meet at UFC Fight Night: Nzechukwu vs. Cuțelaba but Vieira pulled out from the event due to undisclosed reasons.

Announced bouts 
Lightweight bout: Arman Tsarukyan vs. Renato Moicano
Lightweight bout: Natan Levy vs. Pete Rodriguez
Women's Featherweight bout: Chelsea Chandler vs. Danyelle Wolf
Bantamweight bout: Journey Newson vs. Brian Kelleher
Heavyweight bout: Marcos Rogério de Lima vs. Waldo Cortes-Acosta
Middleweight bout: Michał Oleksiejczuk vs. Caio Borralho
Middleweight bout: Cody Brundage vs. Rodolfo Vieira
Welterweight bout: Josh Quinlan vs. Ange Loosa
Flyweight bout: Cody Durden vs. Charles Johnson
Women's Strawweight bout: Emily Ducote vs. Polyana Viana
Featherweight bout: Julian Erosa vs. Fernando Padilla

See also 

 List of UFC events
 List of current UFC fighters
 2023 in UFC

References 

 

UFC Fight Night
2023 in mixed martial arts
Scheduled mixed martial arts events